Burnatsky is a rural locality (a khutor) in Amovskoye Rural Settlement, Novoanninsky District, Volgograd Oblast, Russia. The population was 152 as of 2010. There are 3 streets.

Geography 
Burnatsky is located 37 km southeast of Novoanninsky (the district's administrative centre) by road. Posyolok sovkhoza AMO is the nearest rural locality.

References 

Rural localities in Novoanninsky District